Myron Mathisson (4 December 1897 – 13 September 1940) was a theoretical physicist of Polish and Jewish descent. He is known for his work in general relativity, for developing a new method to analyze the properties of fundamental solutions of linear hyperbolic partial differential equations, and proved, in a special case, the Hadamard conjecture on the class of equations that satisfy the Huygens principle.

Life and work

Education
Mathisson was born in Warsaw, 4 December 1897. He graduated from a Russian philological gymnasium with a gold medal in 1915. He began his studies at the Faculty of Civil Engineering of the Warsaw University of Technology. Then, from 1917 he studied at the University of Warsaw where he graduated in 1924 under the guidance of Czesław Białobrzeski.

Military service
Between the years 1918–1919 he served in the military.

Physics research
In 1930, earned his doctorate at the University of Warsaw on the work of Sur le movement tournant d'un corps dans un champ de gravitation, and began to live there in 1932. He became a professor at the University of Kazan in 1936. The following year, he returned to Warsaw. He corresponded with Albert Einstein. In the years 1937–1939, he worked at the Jagiellonian University, under .

Niels Bohr invited him to Copenhagen. In 1939 he went to Paris, where he met with Jacques Hadamard, and to Cambridge, where he met with Paul Dirac who was impressed enough to publish his recent work posthumously, and to post his obituary.

In chronological order; M. Mathisson, A. Papapetrou, and W. G. Dixon contributed to the derivation of the equations for a spinning body moving in a gravitational field, now known as the Mathisson–Papapetrou–Dixon equations.

Other work

Due to financial difficulties, Mathisson had to work as a Hebrew translator, as a draftsman producing technical drawings, and engineering calculations of the statics of reinforced concrete structures.

Mathisson died of tuberculosis in Cambridge, on 13 September 1940.

Publications
During his short lifetime, he published the following 12 scientific papers:

See also

Józef Lubański

References

Further reading

Polish relativity theorists
Quantum mechanics
1897 births
1940 deaths
19th-century Polish Jews
University of Warsaw alumni
Jewish physicists